Lawrence Stumbaugh (born August 24, 1940) is an American politician. He served as a Democratic member for the 55th district of the Georgia State Senate.

Life and career 
Stumbaugh was born in Escambia County, Florida. He attended Lipscomb University.

In 1975, Stumbaugh was elected to represent the 55th district of the Georgia State Senate. He served until the 1990s.

References 

1940 births
Living people
People from Escambia County, Florida
Democratic Party Georgia (U.S. state) state senators
20th-century American politicians
Lipscomb University alumni